MCOT HD (in Thailand called Channel 9 MCOT HD ) is a Thai free-to-air television network launched on 24 June 1955 and owned by MCOT.

History 
The channel was originally launched as Channel 4 Bang Khun Phrom (ช่อง 4 บางขุนพรหม) with test transmissions beginning on 6 September 1954 and beginning formal broadcasts on 24 June 1955. The then new channel operated under the management of the Thai Television Company (founded 1952). The channel began to broadcast daily in 1957.

In 1974, the channel migrated from broadcasting in black-and-white at 525-lines on VHF channel 4 to a colour using a 625-line system on VHF channel 9 (the second in Southeast Asia). On 3 February 1977, the Thai Television Company was dissolved and channel 9 was put under direct State administration.

On 28 June 1981, Princess Sirindhorn and King Bhumibol Adulyadej officially inaugurated the new MCOT buildings on a 57-meters-square terrain with a television transmission, the largest in the country at the time, at 9:25 am. On 16 July 1987, Channels 3 and 9 signed a broadcasting expansion agreement. In 1992, Sangchai Sunthornwat became the director of MCOT.

On 6 November 2002, the channel was rebranded as Modernine TV. During the 2006 Thai coup d'état, the network was forced to stop broadcasting.

Logo

See also 
 Media of Thailand

References

External links

24-hour television news channels
Television stations in Thailand
Television channels and stations established in 1955
1955 establishments in Thailand